is a Japanese male short track speed skater.

References

External links
Satoshi Sakashita's profile, from http://www.sochi2014.com; retrieved 2014-04-21.
Satoshi Sakashita at ISU

1989 births
Living people
Japanese male short track speed skaters
Olympic short track speed skaters of Japan
Short track speed skaters at the 2014 Winter Olympics
Asian Games medalists in short track speed skating
Asian Games bronze medalists for Japan
Short track speed skaters at the 2007 Asian Winter Games
Medalists at the 2007 Asian Winter Games